Drue Chrisman (born July 7, 1997) is an American football punter for the Cincinnati Bengals of the National Football League (NFL). He played college football at Ohio State and was signed as an undrafted free agent by the Cincinnati Bengals after the 2021 NFL Draft.

College career
Chrisman was ranked as a threestar recruit by 247Sports.com coming out of high school. He committed to Ohio State on May 5, 2015.

Professional career

Cincinnati Bengals
Chrisman was signed as an undrafted free agent by the Cincinnati Bengals on May 2, 2021. He was waived on August 31, 2021 and re-signed to the practice squad the next day. He was released on September 7, 2021. He was re-signed to the practice squad on October 5, 2021. He was released on October 12, 2021.

Pittsburgh Steelers
On December 8, 2021, Chrisman was signed to the Pittsburgh Steelers practice squad, but released two days later.

Cincinnati Bengals (second stint)
On December 14, 2021, Chrisman was signed to the Cincinnati Bengals practice squad. He was released on January 18, 2022. He signed a reserve/future contract with the Bengals on February 7, 2022.

On August 30, 2022, Chrisman was waived by the Bengals and signed to the practice squad the next day. He was signed to the active roster on December 6, 2022 following the release of veteran Kevin Huber.

References

1997 births
Living people
American football punters
Ohio State Buckeyes football players
Cincinnati Bengals players
Pittsburgh Steelers players